Cleveland Street may refer to:

Australia
Cleveland Street, Sydney, a busy thoroughfare in the city of Sydney
Cleveland Street Intensive English High School, a high school in New South Wales

United Kingdom
Cleveland Street, London, a Fitzrovian street on the border of the boroughs of Westminster and Camden, London

United States
Cleveland Street, a historic main street in Clearwater, Florida
Cleveland Street District, a historic district in Durham, North Carolina
Cleveland Street station, a subway station on the BMT Jamaica Line in Brooklyn, New York
Cleveland Street United States Post Office, a historic site in Clearwater, Florida

See also

Cleveland Street scandal, an 1889 incident in London
Cleveland Street Workhouse, a Georgian property in London
Cleveland Avenue (disambiguation)
Cleveland (disambiguation)